Kliningan is a Sundanese musical genre that includes the Kawih (singer) accompanied by gamelan.

Gamelan ensembles and genres
Sundanese music